The lieutenant governor of North Dakota is a political office in North Dakota. The lieutenant governor's duty is to preside as President of the Senate, and is responsible for legislative relations, the state budget and agribusiness development. In the event the office of the governor becomes vacant, the lieutenant governor assumes that office and appoints a replacement lieutenant.

The current lieutenant governor is Tammy Miller, having been appointed by Governor Doug Burgum.

Before 1974, the lieutenant governor of North Dakota was elected separately from the governor. To avoid hostile relations between a lieutenant governor and governor from different parties, the process was changed to where the governor and lieutenant governor are elected together on a joint ballot and are of the same party.

Lieutenant governors of North Dakota 
Parties

References

External links
Biography of the North Dakota Lieutenant Governor

Lieutenant Governor
Lieutenant governors
Lieutenant governors
North Dakota